Nova School of Business & Economics (Nova SBE) is a leading business school in Portugal and one of the best business schools in the world in the areas of Economics, Finance and Management. It offers Bachelor's, Master's, Ph.D., MBA as well as Executive Education programs.

Nova SBE is on the list of the 30 best business schools in Europe with about 3000 students from more than 70 different countries. Its programs are recognized by a wide range of academic rankings, such as the Financial Times Ranking, The Economist, Eduniversal, Times Higher Education and QS World Rankings.

A member of the CEMS Alliance since December 2007, it is the only university in the country that offers the renowned CEMS Master in Management, which is ranked 8th in the world by the Financial Times Ranking. Furthermore, Nova SBE is also a member of the restricted group of Triple Crown world schools, which implies accreditation by EQUIS, AMBA and AACSB, and is the only Portuguese school classified by Eduniversal as "Universal Business School" with five Eduniversal Palms placing the school within the best 1% of world's leading business schools.

It was one of the first Portuguese business schools to acquire international accreditations and recognition of world renown in higher education. The international vision of Nova SBE is also reflected in the adoption of English as the main teaching language.

The current Dean is Professor Pedro Oliveira (PhD, University of North Carolina at Chapel Hill).

The new campus in Carcavelos (Municipality of Cascais) was inaugurated on September 29, 2018. The financing of the Carcavelos Campus project was made possible by corporate and individual donations. From 1978 (the year it was founded) until 1988, Nova SBE campus was in Campo Grande. After that, and until it moved to Carcavelos in September 2018, the School was housed in the 19th-century building of the former Jesuit College of Campolide.

Nova SBE in Numbers 
 100% Classes taught in English
 Top 30 Business Schools in Europe (Financial Times)
 Top 15 Msc in Finance in the world (Financial Times)
 300+ Exchange agreements with schools all over the world
 100% Graduates are working within 6 months
 60% of the Masters’ graduates go on to work abroad
 30+ countries welcome, annually, Nova SBE Masters’ students in placements
 19,000+ Nova SBE Alumni in 60+ countries
 60 Corporate Partners

Programs 
Bachelor's degree
 Economics
 Management
Portuguese and Business

Master's degree
 Economics
 Finance
 Management
 CEMS Master in International Management
 Law and Management
 Impact Entrepreneurship and Innovation
 International Development and Public Policy
 Business Analytics

Ph.D.
 Economics and Finance
 Management

MBA
 The Lisbon MBA

Easter Schools

Future Leaders

Spring Law School

No Great Tactics without Great Talents

Summer Schools

 Nova SBE PhD Summer School
 Nova SBE Kick-off Your Future
 Football 90+
 Summer ELSA Law School
 Lisbon Doctoral Summer School in Economics
 Summer School Beyond the Atlantic

Nova SBE Executive Education

Knowledge at Nova SBE: Faculty, Knowledge Centers, Hubs & Labs 
Ranked Excellent in Research by Portugal's Science and Technology Foundation.

Faculty and research play a central role in knowledge creation and dissemination at Nova SBE. The international orientation of Nova SBE is also represented in the faculty body from over 25 different nationalities. Led by its faculty, research underpins its academic output. We value insight and experimentation that results in positive changes in the world, the kind that challenges the status quo, encourages entrepreneurs, influences leaders, and inspires people to wonder ‘why not?’.

Research at Nova SBE is combined in the Nova SBE research unit, Knowledge Centers, Hubs & Labs. The research unit integrates the three basic disciplinary areas – Economics, Finance, and Management – and all its researchers into a single unit.

Knowledge Centers are aggregating units. They allow faculty members to work in the different phases of knowledge creation, transfer and dissemination. Many aggregate labs & projects.

Labs are research and innovation infrastructures, they bring together various stakeholders to generate creative ideas, products/services, data, etc.

Hubs streamline communities creating links and activation events.

Both provide conditions to experimentation (Labs) and connect (Hubs).

The eight Knowledge Centers at Nova SBE are conducting research with a dedicated focus on individual subjects and a cross-disciplinary orientation.

Nova SBE Data Science Knowledge Center
Nova SBE Economics for Policy Knowledge Center
Nova SBE Economics of Education Knowledge Center
Nova SBE Environmental Economics Knowledge Center
Nova SBE Finance Knowledge Center
Nova SBE Health Economics & Management Knowledge Center
Nova SBE Leadership for Impact Knowledge Center
Nova SBE NOVAFRICA Knowledge Center

Labs:

 Nova SBE Innovation & Design Lab
Nova SBE Digital Experience Lab
 Social Sciences Data Lab
 Nova SBE Behavioral Lab

Hubs:

Nova SBE Entrepreneurship Hub
 Nova SBE Sustainability Hub

Student organizations 
Nova SBE has more than 35 different clubs. Each with its purpose, drive, and passion. Ranging from professional clubs like Nova Women in Business or the Portfolio Management Club, to Social Clubs like the Nova Surf Club or Tuna Fortuna.100+ Students volunteer in 60 Non-Profit Organizations.The Nova SBE Student's Union was founded in 1986, with the mission to represent all Nova SBE students.

160 events on average, are organized by student clubs every year.

Rankings and Accreditations
Various international university rankings regularly rank Nova SBE among the leading European management institutions. Rankings, such as the QS World University Ranking, the Financial Times ranking, The Economist ranking, The Eduniversal rankings, or the Times Higher Education (THE) ranking  confirm that Nova SBE is one of the top business schools in Europe.

Financial Times 
16th International Master's in Management, worldwide
14th International Master's in Finance, worldwide
30th Business School, worldwide
Top 50 Executive Education, worldwide
22nd The Lisbon MBA, in Europe

The Economist 

 8th CEMS Master's in International Management, worldwide
 34th Master's in International Management, worldwide

QS World University Ranking 
 37th Master's in Management, worldwide
 43rd Master's in Finance, worldwide 
 8th CEMS Master's in International Management, worldwide

Times Higher Education 

 11th Master's in Finance, worldwide
 14th Master's in Management, worldwide

Eduniversal 

Awarded with the maximum of 5 palmes: Universal Business School 
 3rd Master's in Economics, in Europe
 6th Master's in Finance, in Europe
 9th CEMS Master's in International Management, in

Areas of Expertise:

 4th Human Resources Management, in Europe
 5th Accounting and Auditing, in Europe
 5th Business Economics
 8th Marketing, in Europe
 8th Strategy & International Business, in Europe
 5th Social Enterprise, worldwide
 6th Development & Trade, worldwide
 6th Operations Management, worldwide
 7th Innovation and Entrepreneurship, worldwide
 15th Financial Markets, worldwide

The Carcavelos Campus 
The campus project combines academic quality with the lifestyle that Portugal - especially the Lisbon and Cascais region – has to offer: safe, cozy, near the sea, and accessible, in a country with history and culture. Facing the sea next to the Carcavelos beach, with an area of more than 75,061 m2, with low buildings and large open green spaces open to the community, the ideology of the campus is based on four pillars:

 Collaborative teaching — The space allows for the application of new teaching paradigms, focused on collaborative learning; 
 Cozy and comfortable environment;
 Openness to the community among students, teachers, Alumni, companies, and neighbors;
 Nova Way of Life — which embodies academic rigor aimed at making an effective impact on the lives of individuals and organizations.

In April 2019 the Carcavelos Campus won the award for Best Real Estate Project of the Year and Best Collective Equipment at the 21st edition of the Real Estate National Awards.

The Fundraising Campaign 
With the objective of financially supporting the construction of the new campus and the development of the school, a private fundraising campaign was launched in 2014 with the goal of raising 50 million euros, led by the Alfredo de Sousa Foundation. The foundation was created by four founders: the Cascais Municipality, Santander Totta Bank, Jerónimo Martins, the Soares dos Santos family, and is named after the founder of Nova SBE — in order to honor the vision and ambition he instilled in the school.

The campaign was supported by over 50 companies and around 2000 individual donors. This is a remarkable case of private fundraising for a public institution.

The school is proud of these contributions, which gave their name to some of the most impressive spaces of the campus, namely the:

 Cascais Academic Hall
 Teresa e Alexandre Soares dos Santos Library
 Santander Academic Hall
 Jerónimo Martins Grand Auditorium
 Ming C. Shu Executive Hall
 Fidelidade Seguros Plaza
 EDP Plaza
 Hovione Atrium
 CTT Student Hall
 Sagres Beach Way
 SUMOL+COMPAL Orchard
 Via Verde Parking
 Navigator Company Park
 Outsystems Square
Westmont Hospitality Hall

There are other spaces, such as auditoriums, connection zones, classrooms, garden benches, among others, named after all of those who decided to contribute to the Nova SBE campus.

Nova SBE is involved in research projects, executive training programs, placement of students, and programs of innovation and digital transformation with all of the companies that contributed.

Notable faculty
 Jorge Braga de Macedo, Minister of Finance in the XII Constitutional Government.
 Miguel Frasquilho, President of AICEP, Secretary of State of the Treasury and Finances in the XV Constitutional Government
 Maria do Carmo Seabra, Minister of Education in the XVI Constitutional Government.
 Luís Campos e Cunha, Minister of Finance in the XVII Constitutional Government.
 José Manuel Neves Adelino, non-executive director at SONAE SGPS.

References

External links

Educational institutions established in 1978
NOVA University Lisbon
Business schools in Europe
1978 establishments in Portugal